The Parliamentary Boundaries (Ireland) Act 1832 was an Act of the Parliament of the United Kingdom which defined the boundaries of the 33 parliamentary boroughs which were represented in the United Kingdom House of Commons. They had originally been named in the Acts of Union 1800. Section 12 of the Representation of the People (Ireland) Act 1832, enacted on the same day, specified that the boundaries were to be defined in this separate Act.

It was enacted a month after the Parliamentary Boundaries Act 1832, which had set out the boundaries of constituencies in England and Wales as required by the Reform Act 1832.

From 1801, the Boroughs of Dublin City, County Dublin and Cork City, County Cork each had two MPs. Under section 11 of the Representation of the People (Ireland) Act 1832, a second seat was granted to the boroughs of Belfast, County Antrim; Galway Borough, County Galway; Limerick City, County Limerick and Waterford, County Waterford.

Each of the 32 counties of Ireland continued to send two MPs to Westminster. Overall, the Representation of the People (Ireland) Act 1832 increased the representation of Ireland from 100 to 105, with Dublin University also increasing its representation from 1 to 2 MPs.

The 1832 United Kingdom general election in Ireland held later that year using the new definitions of the constituency boundaries.

In 1870, the boroughs of Cashel and Sligo were disenfranchised due to corruption.

The constituency boundaries were replaced by those in the Redistribution of Seats Act 1885 and the Act was repealed for the Republic of Ireland by the Electoral Act 1963. The whole Act, so far as unrepealed, was repealed for Northern Ireland by the First Schedule to the Statute Law Revision Act 1950.

Schedule of Boundaries

See also

 List of Acts of the Parliament of the United Kingdom, 1820–1839

References
 :
 c.88: Representation of the People (Ireland) Act 1832
 c.89: Parliamentary Boundaries (Ireland) Act 1832
 

1832 in Ireland
Acts of the Parliament of the United Kingdom concerning Ireland
History of Ireland (1801–1923)
United Kingdom Acts of Parliament 1832
Electoral reform in Ireland (1801–1921)